Chevet is a civil parish in the metropolitan borough of the City of Wakefield, West Yorkshire, England.  The parish contains four listed buildings that are recorded in the National Heritage List for England.  All the listed buildings are designated at Grade II, the lowest of the three grades, which is applied to "buildings of national importance and special interest".  The main building in the parish was Chevet Hall, but this was demolished in 1955.  The parish does not contain any settlement, and the listed buildings consist of a farm, with a farmhouse and farm buildings, a gate lodge and associated structures, and a former boat house.


Buildings

References

Citations

Sources

 

Lists of listed buildings in West Yorkshire